The Instituto de Biomecanica de Valencia (IBV) is a Technology Center that studies the behavior of people in their relation to the products, environments and services.

References

Research institutes in Spain